Ad Mutriam was a fort in the Roman province of Dacia in the 2nd century AD.

Etymology 
Romanian archaeologist and historian Grigore Tocilescu assumes that Amutria should be read Ad-mutriam, Ad Mutriam or Ad Mutrium, meaning by/at the Mutrium (Motru). The modern Romanian linguist Sorin Olteanu is also suggesting the form Ad Mutrius, with Mutrius possibly being the ancient name of Motru River.

See also
Amutria
List of castra

Notes

External links
Roman castra from Romania - Google Maps / Earth

References
 
 
 

Roman Dacia
Archaeological sites in Romania
Roman legionary fortresses in Romania
History of Oltenia
Historic monuments in Gorj County